Lawrence Michael Rotunda (born March 30, 1958) is an American retired professional wrestler. He is best known for his appearances with the World Wrestling Federation and World Championship Wrestling in the 1980s and 1990s under the ring names Mike Rotunda, Mike Rotundo, Michael Wallstreet, Irwin R. Schyster, and V.K. Wallstreet.

Rotunda held several singles and tag team championships including the NWA World Tag Team Championship, NWA World Television Championship and WWF World Tag Team Championship. On July 23, 2022, he was inducted into the George Tragos/Lou Thesz Professional Wrestling Hall of Fame.

Early life 
Rotunda was born on March 30, 1958, in St. Petersburg, Florida. He attended Newark Valley High School in Newark Valley, New York. He transferred to Owego Free Academy where he lettered in football and wrestling. He graduated from OFA in 1976.  He participated in amateur wrestling, becoming a sectional champion in the 215 lb class in 1976, and placing 4th at the New York State Championships. After graduating from high school, Rotunda attended Syracuse University. He competed in football and amateur wrestling, becoming Eastern Intercollegiate Wrestling Association champion in 1981, in the heavyweight division and becoming a letterwinner in 1977, 1978, 1979 and 1981.

Professional wrestling career

Early career (1981–1984) 
After graduating from Syracuse University, Rotunda traveled to Germany where he trained as a professional wrestler under The Destroyer. He debuted in 1981, wrestling for promotions including Lutte Internationale, Jim Crockett Promotions and Championship Wrestling from Florida.

World Wrestling Federation (1984–1986)

Rotunda and Barry Windham joined the World Wrestling Federation as The U.S. Express in 1984, during which time he was billed as Mike Rotundo rather than Rotunda. They won the WWF World Tag Team Championship twice, first from Dick Murdoch and Adrian Adonis in January 1985. The US Express' most notable feud was with The Iron Sheik and Nikolai Volkoff, to whom they lost the title at the first WrestleMania. The US Express regained the belts in June 1985, but lost them two months later to Brutus Beefcake and Greg Valentine. Windham left the WWF soon after.

Rotunda continued to wrestle in singles matches until he left the WWF himself, in early 1986. He briefly returned to the WWF in the fall of 1986 to team with "Golden Boy" Dan Spivey as a new version of "The U.S. Express", but they were more or less used as a jobber team against up-and-coming teams such as Demolition in house shows. They were not considered top contenders.

American Wrestling Association (1986)
The U.S. Express reunited in the AWA to wrestle at WrestleRock 86 on April 20, 1986, defeating The Fabulous Ones. The team did not stay long as Windham left the AWA very shortly after debuting. Rotunda stayed around for a few more months with little success.

Florida Championship Wrestling (1987)
Rotunda left the WWF in early 1987 and returned to Florida, where he won the NWA Florida Heavyweight Championship in March. There, he feuded with Sir Oliver Humperdink's "Shock Troops" stable.

Jim Crockett Promotions / World Championship Wrestling (1987–1991)

Later in the year, Rotunda joined the National Wrestling Alliance affiliate Jim Crockett Promotions, where he lingered at mid-card level as a face before turning heel and joining Kevin Sullivan's Varsity Club, a group of wrestlers with amateur wrestling credentials. Rotunda began bickering with fellow Varsity Club member Rick Steiner, a graduate of the University of Michigan, over which of the two had a superior alma mater. This in turn led to the two arguing over which of them was the superior wrestler.

Rotunda won the NWA World Television Championship from Nikita Koloff in January 1988, and subsequently gave his Florida Heavyweight title to Steiner. He then began a feud with Jimmy Garvin, because Sullivan wanted Garvin's wife Precious. Steiner left the group and began feuding with Rotunda, the enemies trading the Television Championship before Rotunda lost it to Sting.

"Dr. Death" Steve Williams and Dan Spivey joined the Varsity Club in late 1988, and Rotunda teamed with Williams to win the NWA World Tag Team Championship from The Road Warriors. Referee Theodore Long turned heel during the match and administered a fast three count, enabling Rotunda and Williams to overcome the champions. Long went on to become a manager following the controversial officiating.

In May 1989, Williams and Rotunda were stripped of the title and, shortly after Sullivan and Rotunda concluded a feud with the Steiner Brothers, Rotunda briefly left the NWA. He returned in 1990 as a face, using the shipowner gimmick Captain Mike Rotunda. He formed a "crew" (consisting of Abdullah the Butcher and Norman the Lunatic) and feuded with Kevin Sullivan's new stable, "Sullivan's Slaughterhouse" (Cactus Jack, Buzz Sawyer, and Bam Bam Bigelow).

In mid-1990, Rotunda turned heel again and became Michael Wallstreet, with Alexandra York (and her computer) as his manager. They founded The York Foundation. The two claimed to know (via computer analysis) how to win each match and how long it would take for Wallstreet to become victorious. In this brief run he was undefeated and often a timer was present onscreen to further the duo's claim. The partnership ended when Rotunda left the NWA for a new role in the WWF, in early 1991.

World Wrestling Federation

Singles competition (1991–1992) 
Rotunda returned to the WWF in April 1991, becoming Irwin R. Schyster, abbreviated to I.R.S.. Schyster had a heel gimmick as a former IRS tax collector from Washington, D.C., harassing wrestlers and fans as "tax cheats" and scolding them to "pay their fair share". For example, at a show in Rhode Island, he attacked the state for being a tax haven for yacht owners from New York, or when wrestling in New Hampshire, he would get on the microphone and criticize the fans there for not having to pay a state income tax.  To further add to this persona, one of his finishing moves was called The Write-Off (i.e., a flying clothesline to an oncoming opponent).

He made his pay-per-view debut at SummerSlam 1991, defeating Greg "The Hammer" Valentine. Schyster also made it to the finals of the 1991 King of the Ring tournament, defeating The Berzerker, Hacksaw Jim Duggan and Jerry Sags before losing to Bret Hart in the final match. He then had a short-lived feud with Big Bossman in the fall of 1991. This culminated in a 6-man elimination tag team match at Survivor Series, where he teamed with The Natural Disasters in a losing effort against Bossman and The Legion of Doom (the former Road Warriors). In January 1992, he competed in the Royal Rumble match entering at number 18 and lasted 28 minutes, giving him the third longest run behind Roddy Piper and winner Ric Flair.

Money Inc. (1992–1993) 

In February 1992, Schyster formed the tag team Money Inc. with Ted DiBiase; the two won the WWF Tag Team Championship together three times and was the dominant Tag-Team of 1992–1993. In the eighteen months Money Inc. were together, they held the titles for a total of almost fourteen months.

Money Inc.'s first title reign was at the expense of The Legion of Doom, making Rotunda the only wrestler to twice defeat them for a tag team title. They then feuded with the Natural Disasters, losing the titles to them and then regaining them a few months later. Finally, in spring 1993, Money Inc. entered into a months long feud with The Steiner Brothers, and in June the two teams traded the titles three times in ten days, with DiBiase and IRS losing the tag team title twice to the Steiners. Ted DiBiase retired from wrestling to become a commentator in the summer of 1993, resulting in Schyster going back to singles competition after a final attempt to reclaim the tag-titles in a cage match in the lead-up to Summerslam '93 in a losing effort against the Steiners.

Million Dollar Corporation (1994–1995) 

In the beginning of 1994, IRS feuded with Razor Ramon, challenging him for the Intercontinental Championship at the Royal Rumble. Though Schyster had seemingly won the title after interference by Shawn Michaels, a second referee restarted the match, unbeknownst to Schyster, who was then given the "Razor's Edge" while celebrating with the title belt. Schyster then feuded with Tatanka, whom he accused of failing to pay a gift tax on a "sacred headdress" he received from Chief Jay Strongbow.

In mid-1994 he joined his former partner DiBiase's Million Dollar Corporation, often teaming with fellow member Bam Bam Bigelow, in an unsuccessful effort to regain tag team gold. Schyster later refocused on singles wrestling. His feud with The Undertaker included Schyster repossessing the headstone of a child, and interfering in a Casket Match between The Undertaker and Yokozuna. When the two eventually squared off at the 1995 Royal Rumble, the Undertaker was victorious following a chokeslam, but Schyster stole his urn after the match. I.R.S. then competed less frequently on WWF TV. His final three appearances on TV being a loss to Savio Vega in a King of the Ring qualifying match in June 1995, the July 17, 1995 edition of Monday Night Raw in a losing effort against Shawn Michaels and later that month as a lumberjack at In Your House 2: The Lumberjacks. His final appearance came on July 30, 1995, at a house show in Jean, NV where he unsuccessfully challenged Shawn Michaels for the Intercontinental Championship. After this Rotunda then left the WWF.

World Championship Wrestling

Debut and New World Order (1995–1997)

Rotunda returned to WCW in September 1995. On the debut of WCW Monday Nitro, which aired on September 4, 1995, he was introduced as Michael Wallstreet, but by the next episode he was known as V.K. Wallstreet (the "V.K." an allusion to Vincent Kennedy McMahon) with announcer Eric Bischoff asking Bobby Heenan on-air why his name had suddenly changed. Rotunda used the name for nearly a year while wrestling in a lower midcard position. The highlight of this run came at the 1996 Battlebowl, where he teamed with Jim Duggan and made it to the semifinals before losing to Dick Slater and Earl Robert Eaton. Eventually his name returned to Michael Wallstreet and Mr. Wallstreet, and in December 1996, he joined the nWo after being offered a membership by former tag team partner Ted DiBiase. While in the nWo, Wallstreet remained in the low midcard. His highest profile match in this period was a loss to Jeff Jarrett at nWo Souled Out in January 1997. On the April 21 episode of Nitro, Wallstreet was forced out of the nWo when his nWo contract was declared null and void by J. J. Dillon, due to his pre-existing WCW contract. Despite this, he appeared with the nWo weeks later on the May 5 Nitro, before finally accepting Dillon's ruling and leaving the group. Although no longer an nWo member, he openly expressed his contempt for WCW (frequently wearing anti-WCW T-shirts to the ring). In the summer of 1997, he left for New Japan Pro-Wrestling, which had a business relationship with WCW.

Varsity Club reunion and departure (1999–2000)
He returned (as Mike Rotunda) to WCW at Starrcade 1999, reforming the Varsity Club with Rick Steiner and Kevin Sullivan to team with Jim Duggan against The Revolution (Shane Douglas, Dean Malenko, Perry Saturn, and Asya). His team lost when they abandoned Duggan during the match. In early 2000, he took part in a "Lethal Lottery" tournament for the vacated WCW World Tag Team Championship, paired with Buzzkill. The two defeated Dean Malenko and Konnan in the first round, but lost in the quarterfinals to the Harris Brothers. Rotunda left WCW in the spring of 2000. He returned to Japan and also made some appearances for the World Wrestling Council in Puerto Rico.

New Japan Pro-Wrestling (1997–1999)
Rotunda jumped to New Japan Pro-Wrestling in the summer of 1997 (as Michael Wallstreet), where he joined nWo Japan. He toured full-time with New Japan and was used in the midcard. Like many gaijin, he wasn't used at Dome Shows and was left off New Japan's top tournaments such as the G1 Climax and the Super Grade Tag League tournaments. Wallstreet did participate in two other tournaments. In May 1998, he teamed with Big Titan in a tournament for the vacant IWGP Tag Team Championship, losing in the first round to Kensuke Sasaki and Kazuo Yamazaki. In September 1998, he teamed with Scott Norton in a tournament to decide the #1 contenders for the WCW World Tag Team Championship. They made it to the semifinals, where they lost to eventual tournament winners Kensuke Sasaki and Yuji Nagata.

In 1999, Masahiro Chono left nWo Japan and formed a new group: Team 2000. Wallstreet and nWo Sting followed. Wallstreet, along with the rest of Team 2000, feuded with nWo Japan throughout 1999. In December, Rotunda left New Japan when he was called back to WCW.

All Japan Pro Wrestling (2000–2003)

Rotunda (as Mike Rotunda) joined All Japan Pro Wrestling in the summer of 2000, shortly after the Pro Wrestling Noah exodus. He reunited the Varsity Club, this time with "Dr. Death" Steve Williams. The team won the 2000 World's Strongest Tag Determination League and also challenged for the World Tag Team Championship, against Taiyō Kea and Johnny Smith on February 24, 2001, but lost. In late 2001, Rotunda returned to Team 2000 as part of the All Japan branch and returned to New Japan for one match, on October 28, teaming with Chono to defeat Tencozy. Rotunda finished the year teaming with Williams in the 2001 World's Strongest Tag Determination League, which they finished in 5th place with 6 points.

In January 2002, Keiji Mutoh jumped to All Japan and eventually became the owner and president. With the arrival of Mutoh, a growing roster, and nagging injuries, Rotunda returned to the midcard. He entered the 2002 Champion Carnival, finishing in 5th place with 3 points. Shortly after, he entered the Giant Baba Six Man Tag Team Tournament, teaming with Steve Williams and Yoji Anjo. The team made it to the semifinals, losing to Genichiro Tenryu, Arashi, and Nobutaka Araya. On July 20, 2002, Rotunda and Williams entered the Stan Hansen Cup 4-Way, and lost to Mike Barton and Jim Steele, Rotunda being pinned by Barton. In autumn, Rotunda and Williams entered the 2002 World's Strongest Tag Determination League, finishing in 4th place with 9 points. Rotunda left All Japan in early 2003, after wrestling on the New Year's Shining Series Tour.

Retirement and sporadic appearances (2003–2023)

Rotunda retired from professional wrestling on a regular basis in 2003, but still had sporadic matches and makes sporadic appearances.

Rotunda started to run a security company with his wife in 2004.

Rotunda was rehired by WWE as a road agent in 2006 and has made guest appearances as Irwin R. Schyster. One such appearance was on the August 6, 2007 edition of WWE Raw; Mr. McMahon was discussing his IRS troubles with Jonathan Coachman, and when the conversation ended, I.R.S lowered the paper covering his face (Financial Times) and revealed himself.

Rotunda appeared as I.R.S. on the December 10, 2007 15th Anniversary edition of Raw, winning a 15-man Battle Royal, only to be paid by his former tag team partner Ted DiBiase to eliminate himself and give DiBiase the win. This was his final match.

On the March 10, 2008 episode of Raw, The U.S. Express were falsely advertised for a rematch from WrestleMania I against Nikolai Volkoff and The Iron Sheik. Before it could start, Jillian Hall offered to sing "Born in the U.S.A." for them, Rotunda gave her an airplane spin and the show went to commercial, effectively ending the feud.

In early 2009, Rotunda once again appeared as I.R.S in multiple segments of "Top Rope Theatre" on WWE.com. He played a prominent role in the conspiracy of the exclusively online storyline of the series, drawing Kelly Kelly into his schemes in opposition to his arch enemy "Hacksaw" Jim Duggan.

I.R.S. appeared on the September 7, 2009 edition of Raw, which Bob Barker hosted. He played a pricing game (similar to the "One Bid" qualifying segment of The Price Is Right) along with Santino Marella, Jillian Hall, and Chris Jericho, bidding on a Best of SmackDown DVD. I.R.S inquired as to whether sales tax had been properly assessed, but overbid $50.00 (including tax); the DVD's actual retail price was $18.99. Jericho won the pricing game with a bid of $1.00 (as erroneously proclaimed by Barker). I.R.S was, later that night, one of the contestants during the second round of the pricing game. A. J. Pierzynski of the Chicago White Sox filled in the vacated spot Jericho held. This time the bid was for a travel package to WrestleMania XXVI in Glendale, Arizona. Schyster bid $2,000 for the package. The actual retail price was $1,247, making Santino the winner after a bid of $1,200.

Rotunda appeared on an episode of Monday Night Raw as a lumberjack in the "'80s Legend Lumberjack Match", in which Christian defeated Ted DiBiase Jr.

On the May 5, 2010 SmackDown, Rotunda helped throw Drew McIntyre out of the arena.

On June 7, 2010, I.R.S appeared on Raw in a comedy segment promoting the new A-Team film. After Ted DiBiase Jr. and Virgil were confronted by A-Team stars Quinton "Rampage" Jackson and Sharlto Copley, in character as B.A. Baracus and H.M. "Howling Mad" Murdoch, respectively, Ted called in his "Uncle Irwin" (an allusion to the long-standing association of DiBiase Jr.'s father the Million Dollar Man Ted DiBiase with I.R.S dating back to Money Inc.) into the room wherein Schyster announced he had repossessed Jerry Lawler's crown, because Lawler had not paid long overdue taxes on the crown's gems. Later in the show, I.R.S, DiBiase Jr., Virgil and Rowdy Roddy Piper were confronted by the A-Team and Dusty Rhodes, who attacked them and reclaimed the crown.

On the June 28 Raw, Rotunda was one of the four people who entered the ring to celebrate Ricky Steamboat's career, but were attacked by the Nexus.

Rotunda appeared on the April 9, 2012 edition of Raw. He, along with numerous other WWE officials and superstars, attempted to break up a brawl between Brock Lesnar and John Cena.

On the January 6, 2014 "Old School" episode of Raw, Irwin R. Schyster encountered Big E Langston on his way to a match and told him to pay his taxes, to which Langston smiled. Immediately prior, Langston walked past fellow Million Dollar Corporation members, Nikolai Volkoff and Ted DiBiase.

He continued work as a WWE road agent and was occasionally seen on TV in 2008.

He was furloughed, along with many other WWE employees, on April 15, 2020, and was officially released on September 10, 2020.

In January 2021, On Raw Legends Night, Rotunda, as I.R.S., made his first appearance since being released by the WWE in a segment backstage with Ric Flair.

On September 3, 2021, the George Tragos/Lou Thesz Professional Wrestling Hall of Fame announced that Rotunda will be inducted into its 2022 Class, along with announcer Jim Ross and Trish Stratus. The induction ceremony took place July 21–23, 2022.

On January 23, 2023, Rotunda as I.R.S made a backstage appearance at Raw is XXX alongside Ted DiBiase.

Personal life
Rotunda is married to Stephanie Rotunda (née Windham), the daughter of wrestler Blackjack Mulligan, and sister of wrestlers Barry and Kendall Windham. They have two sons and one daughter, Windham, Taylor, and Mika. The two sons are professional wrestlers that have both worked for WWE under the ring names Bray Wyatt (former WWE Universal Champion, WWE Champion, SmackDown Tag Team Champion and Raw Tag Team Champion) and Bo Dallas (former NXT Champion and Raw Tag Team Champion with Curtis Axel).

Championships and accomplishments

Amateur wrestling 
 Eastern Intercollegiate Wrestling Association
 Heavyweight Champion (1981)

Professional wrestling 
 All Japan Pro Wrestling
 World's Strongest Tag Determination League (2000) – with "Dr. Death" Steve Williams
 Championship Wrestling from Florida
 NWA Florida Heavyweight Championship (3 times)
 NWA Southern Heavyweight Championship (Florida version) (2 times)
 NWA United States Tag Team Championship (Florida version) (4 times) – with Barry Windham (3 times), and Mike Davis (1 time)
George Tragos/Lou Thesz Professional Wrestling Hall of Fame
Class of 2022
 Jim Crockett Promotions/World Championship Wrestling
 NWA World Television Championship (3 times)
 NWA World Tag Team Championship (Mid-Atlantic version) (1 time) – with Steve Williams
 Maple Leaf Wrestling
 NWA Canadian Television Championship (1 time)
 Pro Wrestling Illustrated
 Ranked No. 26 of the top 500 wrestlers in the PWI 500 in 1994
 Ranked No. 164 of the top 500 wrestlers during the PWI Years in 2003
 Ranked No. 61 of the top 100 tag teams with Ted Dibiase during the PWI Years in 2003
 Ranked No. 48 of the top 100 tag teams with Barry Windham during the PWI Years in 2003
 World Wrestling Federation
 WWF Tag Team Championship (5 times) – with Barry Windham (2) and Ted DiBiase (3)
 Slammy Award (1 time)
 Sweatiest (1994)
 Wrestling Observer Newsletter
 Best Gimmick (1996) – nWo
 Feud of the Year (1996) New World Order vs. World Championship Wrestling

References

External links
 
 
 

1958 births
20th-century professional wrestlers
21st-century professional wrestlers
American male professional wrestlers
American male sport wrestlers
Living people
NWA/WCW World Television Champions
American professional wrestlers of Italian descent
Sportspeople from Syracuse, New York
Professional wrestlers from New York (state)
Professional wrestling trainers
Syracuse Orangemen wrestlers
Syracuse University alumni
The Million Dollar Corporation members
New World Order (professional wrestling) members
Sportspeople from Binghamton, New York
NWA Florida Heavyweight Champions
NWA Southern Heavyweight Champions (Florida version)
NWA United States Tag Team Champions (Florida version)
NWA Canadian Television Champions
WCW World Tag Team Champions